Pen y Gadair Fawr is an  high subsidiary summit of Waun Fach and the second highest peak in the Black Mountains in south-eastern Wales. Marked by a medium-sized cairn, it is a much more distinguished top than its parent 1.5 km to the northwest.

Geology 
The summit and upper slopes of Pen y Gadair Fawr are formed from the Early Devonian Epoch sandstones of the Brownstones Formation, a division of the Old Red Sandstone. Beneath these and forming the lower slopes are the sandstones of the Senni Formation (traditionally the Senni Beds). Mudstone layers within these sandstones are more readily eroded and have given rise to the stepped appearance of parts of the mountain, not least the summit section. Peat has accumulated on parts of the hill in the postglacial period, notably north towards Waun Fach.

Access
The hill is wholly within land mapped under the Countryside and Rights of Way Act 2000 as open country and hence is legally accessible to walkers despite their being no public rights of way leading to it. Mountain bikers can follow the forest roads within nearby Mynydd Du Forest, one of which tops out at 715m, just 0.5 km from the summit, but have no legal access to the hill itself.

References

External links
 www.geograph.co.uk : photos of Waun Fach and surrounding area

Hewitts of Wales
Nuttalls
Mountains and hills of Powys
Black Mountains, Wales
Talgarth